Joseph Papaleo (1925–2004) was an Italian American novelist, and academic.

Life
He grew up in The Bronx. He graduated from Sarah Lawrence College, from Columbia University with an M.A., and from the University of Florence with a Ph.D.

He taught at Sarah Lawrence College.

He lived in Bronxville, New York, and Oldsmar, Florida. 
His work appeared in Harper's, The New Yorker, Paris Review, Paterson Literary Review.

Awards
 2003 American Book Award
 1973 Guggenheim Fellowship

Works

 Unsettling America (Viking/Penguin, 1994)
 Picasso at Ninety One (Seaport Books, 1988)

 All the Comforts, Little, Brown, 1967
 Out of Place 1970

References

External links

1925 births
2004 deaths
People from Bronxville, New York
American writers of Italian descent
Sarah Lawrence College alumni
Sarah Lawrence College faculty
Columbia University alumni
University of Florence alumni
People from Oldsmar, Florida
American Book Award winners